John Wayne "The Gunslinger" Parr (born 25 May 1976), also known as JWP, is a retired Australian Muay Thai fighter, kickboxer and boxer, fighting out of Boonchu Gym in Gold Coast, Queensland. He is a former 10-time World Champion and was the runner up on The Contender Asia.

Biography

Early life
Wayne Parr began training in taekwondo at the age of 11. Wayne competed in the Queensland titles at QE2 Stadium, where he won a silver medal after winning 2 fights and losing the final in 1988. In 1990 Parr started kickboxing, training for a few months before having to move to Sydney. In 1991 Parr moved to Richmond, New South Wales. Wayne found a new kickboxing gym and had his first fight aged 14, losing on a split decision. In 1992 the Parr family moved again to Mornington in Victoria. In 1993 at the age of sixteen, his family moved back to Queensland, and Parr began training with Blair Moore. Moore was one of Queenslands premier promoters of Muay Thai at the time.

Early career in Australia
Parr started participating in professional bouts at the age of 16. Moore trained Parr for 13 fights, with Parr winning an Australian title (63 kg) at the age of 17. Blair helped promote Wayne at Jupiters Casino for 3 fights before he fought for the South Pacific title against Scott Lovelock, winning by 5th-round KO when Parr was 19.

Comeback
On 18 January 2013 Parr came out of retirement to sign a three-fight deal with Powerplay Promotions. The first fight was to be against WKA World Middleweight (−72.5 kg/159.8 lb) Oriental title holder Fadi Merza, but Merza pulled out at the last minute and was replaced on the card with Mostafa Abdollahi. Parr defeated Abdollahi by knock out at 1:30 in the 2nd round with a right hook to win Merza's newly vacated belt.

On 6 July 2013, Parr forced two eight counts on Marco Piqué en route to a decision win at Boonchu Cup: Caged Muay Thai 3 on the Gold Coast, Australia.

Parr intended to tryout for the Australia vs. Canada season of The Ultimate Fighter mixed martial arts reality TV show in September 2013 but a minimum of five professional MMA fights was required for candidates and so he was rejected in spite of his kickboxing and Muay Thai credentials.

He was scheduled to have his rubber match with Cosmo Alexandre at Powerplay Promotions 22 in Melbourne, Australia on 8 November 2013. However, Alexandre did not apply for his visa in time and was unable to enter the country and so he was replaced by New Zealand's Brad Riddell who Parr defeated by unanimous decision.

He defeated Yohan Lidon by decision at Boonchu Cup: Caged Muay Thai 4 in Gold Coast, Australia on 1 March 2014.

Parr lost the WKA World Middleweight (−72.5 kg/159.8 lb) Oriental Championship when he was knocked out by Toby Smith in the third round at Powerplay Promotions 24 in Melbourne on 21 June 2014. On Saturday 11 June 2016 Parr is fighting Greek Pavlos Kaponis at MTGP5 event in London, UK. John Wayne Parr defeated Pavlos Kaponis at Muay Thai Grand Prix 5 on Saturday, 11 June 2016 in London, England. On Friday 14 October 2016 in Perth, Western Australia, Parr fought Daniel Dawson in their third bout at Origins 8 promotion at Herb Graham Rec Centre, Mirrabooka, WA. Parr won the bout via unanimous judges decision.

Parr was expected to fight Jake Purdy of England in the main event of Caged Muay Thai 10 on 4 August 2017 in Brisbane, Australia, however Purdy pulled out of the fight on two days' notice with a broken toe. Purdy was replaced by Irish kickboxer James Heelan. Parr went on to win this fight by unanimous decision.

Bellator Kickboxing
In October 2016 John Wayne Parr signed a three-fight deal with Bellator Kickboxing. His first fight took place on 8 April 2017 in Italy at Bellator Kickboxing 5 against Nando Calzetta. Parr won the fight via knockout in the second round.

In his second outing held in Florence, Italy on 9 December 2017 at Bellator Kickboxing 8 Parr scored the third-round TKO win against Piergiulio Paolucci.

In the third fight on 6 April 2018 in Budapest, Hungary, Parr faced a defeat by decision against Portuguese Eder Lopes.

Rizin Fighting Federation
After the stint in Bellator, Parr signed with Rizin Fighting Federation and made his promotional debut against Danilo Zanolini at Rizin 18 on 18 August 2019. He lost the fight via split decision.

ONE Championship
In March 2020, news surfaced that Parr had signed a six-fight contract with ONE Championship. He made his promotional debut against Nieky Holzken at ONE on TNT III on 21 April 2021. He lost the bout via TKO after a head kick dropped him.

On February 17, 2022, news surfaced that Parr was scheduled to face former ONE Lightweight Champion and wushu champion Eduard Folayang at ONE: X on March 26, 2022 in a Muay Thai rules retirement bout. He lost the fight via unanimous decision.

Outside the ring

Blessed With Venom 
A feature-length documentary chronicling the life of Australian Muay Thai star and 10 time World Champion John Wayne Parr called Blessed With Venom was filmed. The film provides an intimate insight into Parr's early years in Thailand where he endured rigorous training in primitive conditions, to the heights of his accomplishments around the world. We also get to see the personal side of the athlete as a husband and father of two, as a devoted family man and all round nice guy, respected by his opponents.

The documentary also examines seminal fights in Parr's career. From his bloody contests with Thai marvel Orono, which is considered the making of the Gunslinger's legend, to his contemporary battles with Mike Zambidis, Lamsongkram, and the three all out wars with Yodsanklai Fairtex. We bear witness as Parr comes back from 2 losses to ultimately defeat Yodsanklai in Melbourne. A blockbuster encounter between two true giants of the sport doing what they do best, trading bone crunching blows in the brutal world of Muay Thai.

John Wayne Parr has also acted in short movies such as "The Violent", written by James Richards and Keith Macdonald. It was filmed in Australia and won Best Fight Choreography Short award at an international film festival.

Family 
His wife, Angela Rivera-Parr, and daughter, Jasmine Parr, are also fighters.  Angela has fought for the WBC Muay Thai title and won an IAMTF title (International Amateur Muay Thai Federation).  Jasmine is an aspiring kickboxer and won the Australian women's flyweight boxing championship in her first bout.

Fight record 

|- style="background:#fbb;"
|  2022-03-26 || Loss || align="left" | Eduard Folayang || ONE: X || Kallang, Singapore || Decision (unanimous) || 3 || 3:00
|- style="background:#fbb;"
|  2021-04-21 || Loss || align="left" | Nieky Holzken || ONE on TNT 3 || Kallang, Singapore || TKO (head kick) || 2 || 1:23
|-  style="background:#fbb;"
| 2019-08-18 || Loss||align=left| Danilo Zanolini || RIZIN 18 || Nagoya, Japan || Decision (split) || 3 || 3:00
|-  style="background:#fbb;"
| 2018-04-06 || Loss||align=left| Eder Lopes || Bellator Kickboxing 9 || Budapest, Hungary || Decision || 3 || 3:00
|-  style="background:#cfc;"
| 2017-12-10|| Win ||align=left| Piergiulo Paolucci || Bellator Kickboxing 8: Florence || Florence, Italy || TKO (Ref. Stoppage) || 3 || 1:50
|-  style="background:#cfc;"
| 2017-08-04|| Win ||align=left| James Heelan || Caged Muay Thai 10 || Brisbane, Australia || Decision (unanimous) || 5 || 3:00
|-  style="background:#cfc;"
| 2017-04-08|| Win ||align=left| Nando Calzetta || Bellator Kickboxing 5 || Torino, Italy || KO (head kick) || 2 || 2:59
|-  style="background:#cfc;"
| 2016-12-03|| Win ||align=left| Matthew Richardson || Boonchu Cup: Caged Muay Thai 9 || Gold Coast, Australia || Decision (unanimous) || 5 || 3:00
|-  style="background:#cfc;"
| 2016-10-14|| Win ||align=left| Daniel Dawson || Origins 8: Dawson vs JWP III || Perth, Australia || Decision (unanimous) || 5 || 3:00
|-  style="background:#cfc;"
| 2016-06-11|| Win ||align=left| Pavlos Kaponis || Muay Thai Grand Prix 5 || London, United Kingdom || Decision (unanimous) || 5 || 3:00
|-  style="background:#fbb;"
| 2016-03-04 || Loss||align=left| Brad Riddell || Boonchu Cup: Caged Muay Thai 8 || Gold Coast, Australia || Decision (unanimous) || 5 || 3:00
|-  style="background:#cfc;"
| 2015-12-05|| Win ||align=left| Mark Casserly || Boonchu Cup: Caged Muay Thai 7 || Gold Coast, Australia || TKO (Ref. stoppage) || 3 || 3:00 
|-  style="background:#fbb;"
| 2015-10-23 || Loss||align=left| Cosmo Alexandre ||  Lion Fight  25 || Temecula, California, USA || Decision (unanimous) || 5 || 3:00
|-  style="background:#cfc;"
| 2015-05-09 || Win ||align=left| Daniel Kerr || Boonchu Cup: Caged Muay Thai 6 || Gold Coast, Australia || TKO (Ref. stoppage) || 3 || 2:06 
|-  style="background:#fbb;"
| 2014-06-21 || Loss ||align=left| Toby Smith || Powerplay Promotions 24 || Melbourne, Australia || TKO (broken orbital bone) || 3 || 1:58
|-
! style=background:white colspan=9 |
|-  style="background:#cfc;"
| 2014-03-01 || Win ||align=left| Yohan Lidon || Boonchu Cup: Caged Muay Thai 4 || Gold Coast, Australia || Decision || 5 || 3:00 
|-  style="background:#cfc;"
|2013-11-08|| Win ||align=left| Brad Riddell || Powerplay Promotions 22 || Melbourne, Australia || Decision (unanimous) || 5 || 3:00 
|-  style="background:#cfc;"
|2013-07-06|| Win ||align=left| Marco Piqué || Boonchu Cup: Caged Muay Thai 3 || Gold Coast, Australia || Decision || 5 || 3:00
|-  style="background:#cfc;"
|2013-04-19|| Win ||align=left| Mostafa Abdollahi || Pay Back Time 4 || Melbourne, Australia || KO (right hook) || 2 || 1:30
|-
! style=background:white colspan=9 |
|-  style="background:#cfc;"
|2012-06-24|| Win ||align=left| Jordan Tai || Boonchu Cup: Caged Muay Thai || Australia || KO (uppercut) || 4 || 2:11
|-  style="background:#cfc;"
|2011-12-03|| Win ||align=left| Nonsai Sor.Sanyakorn || Evolution 25 || Australia || Decision (split) || 5 || 3:00
|-  style="background:#cfc;"
|2011-07-30|| Win ||align=left| Mostafa Abdollahi || Capital Punishment 4 || Canberra, Australia || TKO (punches) || 2 || 3:00
|-  style="background:#cfc;"
| 2011-05-27|| Win ||align=left| Mike Zambidis || Payback Time, "The Decider" || Melbourne, Australia ||TKO (three knockdowns) || 1 || 2:59
|-
! style=background:white colspan=9 |
|-  style="background:#fbb;"
| 2010-12-18 || Loss ||align=left| Zhang Kaiyin || Bruce Lee 70th Birthday Celebrations || Shun De, China || Decision (unanimous) || 5 || 3:00
|-  style="background:#cfc;"
| 2010-10-17 || Win ||align=left| Yodsanklai Fairtex || Pay Back Time 2, Powerplay Promotions || Melbourne, Australia || Decision (split)|| 5 || 3:00
|-
! style=background:white colspan=9 |
|-  style="background:#fbb;"
| 2010-09-11 || Loss ||align=left| Bruce Macfie || Evolution 21 || Brisbane, Australia || Decision (split) || 5 || 3:00
|-  style="background:#cfc;"
| 2010-06-12 || Win ||align=left| Lamsongkram Chuwattana || Muay Thai Warriors || Melbourne, Victoria, Australia || Decision (split) || 5 || 3:00
|-  style="background:#c5d2ea;"
| 2010-04-24 || Draw ||align=left| Eugene Ekkelboom || Evolution 20 || Brisbane, Australia || Decision || 5 || 3:00
|-
! style=background:white colspan=9 |
|-  style="background:#cfc;"
| 2010-03-13 || Win ||align=left| Dmitry Valent || Domination 4 || Bentley, Australia || Decision (unanimous) || 5 || 3:00
|-
! style=background:white colspan=9 |
|-  style="background:#cfc;"
| 2009-11-29 || Win ||align=left| Eli Madigan || Evolution 19 || Brisbane, Australia || Decision (unanimous) || 5 || 3:00
|-  style="background:#fbb;"
| 2009-08-29 || Loss ||align=left| Cosmo Alexandre || Evolution 17 Super 8 Tournament Semi-final || Brisbane, Australia || TKO (low kicks) || 2 || :
|-  style="background:#cfc;"
| 2009-08-29 || Win ||align=left| Jason Scerri || Evolution 17 Super 8 Tournament Quarter-final || Brisbane, Australia || Decision (unanimous) || 3 || 3:00
|-  style="background:#fbb;"
| 2009-06-26 || Loss ||align=left| Buakaw Por. Pramuk || Champions of Champions II || Montego Bay, Jamaica || Decision (unanimous) || 5 || 3:00
|-
! style=background:white colspan=9 |
|-  style="background:#cfc;"
| 2009-05-08 || Win ||align=left| Mike Zambidis || Pay Back Time, Powerplay Promotions || Melbourne, Victoria, Australia || Decision (unanimous) || 5 || 3:00
|-  style="background:#fbb;"
| 2009-04-04 || Loss ||align=left| Mardsue Tum || Evolution 16 || Brisbane, Australia || Decision (unanimous) || 5 || 3:00
|-  style="background:#cfc;"
| 2008-12-06 || Win ||align=left| Sean Wright || Evolution 15 "The Contender Qualifier || Brisbane, Australia || TKO || 2 || 3:00
|-
! style=background:white colspan=9 |
|-  style="background:#cfc;"
| 2008-09-16 || Win ||align=left| Dzhabar Askerov || Evolution 14 "The Contenders" || Brisbane, Australia || Decision(unanimous) || 5 || 3:00
|-  style="background:#fbb;"
| 2008-04-12 || Loss ||align=left| Yodsanklai Fairtex || The Contender Asia Finale || Singapore || Decision(unanimous) || 5 || 3:00
|-  style="background:#cfc;"
| 2008-01-20 || Win ||align=left| Kozo Takeda || SNKA "Brave Hearts 7" || Bunkyo, Tokyo, Japan || KO (left hook) || 4 || 1:20
|-
! style=background:white colspan=9 |
|-  style="background:#cfc;"
| 2007-12-01 || Win ||align=left| Cosmo Alexandre || Evolution 12 || Brisbane, Australia || Decision (unanimous) || 5 || 3:00
|-
! style=background:white colspan=9 |
|-  style="background:#cfc;"
| 2007–10 || Win ||align=left| Dzhabar Askerov || The Contender Asia Episode 14 || Singapore || Decision (unanimous) || 5 || 3:00
|-  style="background:#cfc;"
| 2007–10 || Win ||align=left| Zidov Akuma || The Contender Asia Episode 11 || Singapore || KO (right cross) || 3 || 1:44
|-  style="background:#cfc;"
| 2007–09 || Win ||align=left| Rafik Bakkouri || The Contender Asia Episode 3 || Singapore || Decision (unanimous) || 5 || 3:00
|-  style="background:#cfc;"
| 2007-07-21 || Win ||align=left| Jun Kim || K-1 Fighting Network KHAN 2007 || Seoul, South Korea || Decision (unanimous) || 3 || 3:00
|-  style="background:#cfc;"
| 2006-11-25 || Win ||align=left| Bruce Macfie || Evolution 9 "Revenge or Repeat" || Gold Coast, Australia || KO ||  || :
|-  style="background:#cfc;"
| 2006-09-16 || Win ||align=left| Soren Monkongtong || Evolution 8 "Final Count Down" || Gold Coast, Australia || KO(Right) ||  || :
|-  style="background:#cfc;"
| 2006-07-28 || Win ||align=left| Greg Foley || Jabout presents "Destiny" || Penrith, Australia || Decision (unanimous) ||  || :
|-  style="background:#fbb;"
| 2006-06-02 || Loss ||align=left| Wanlop Sitpholek || Evolution 7 "Fight for a Cause" || Brisbane, Australia || Decision (split) || 5 || 3:00
|-  style="background:#fbb;"
| 2006-04-28 || Loss ||align=left| Oomsin Sitkuanam || SNKA Titans 3rd || Shibuya, Tokyo, Japan || Decision (majority) || 5 || 3:00
|-  style="background:#fbb;"
| 2006-03-12 || Loss ||align=left| Steven Wakeling || WBC Muay Thai Championships || London, England, UK || Decision (split) || 5 || 3:00
|-
! style=background:white colspan=9 |
|-  style="background:#fbb;"
| 2005-12-10 || Loss ||align=left| Yodsanklai Fairtex || Xplosion 12 || Gold Coast, Australia || Decision (unanimous) || 5 || 3:00
|-
! style=background:white colspan=9 |
|-  style="background:#cfc;"
| 2005-11-25 || Win ||align=left| Bruce Macfie || Evolution 6 "Two Tribes Go To War!" || Gold Coast, Australia || Decision || 5 || 3:00
|-  style="background:#cfc;"
| 2005-10-12 || Win ||align=left| Toshiyuki Kinami || K-1 World MAX 2005 Champions Challenge || Shibuya, Tokyo, Japan || Decision (unanimous) || 3 || 3:00
|-  style="background:#cfc;"
| 2005-08-22 || Win ||align=left| Kozo Takeda || SNKA "TITANS 2nd" || Shibuya, Tokyo, Japan || KO (right hook) || 3 || 2:24
|-
! style=background:white colspan=9 |
|-  style="background:#fbb;"
| 2005-07-20 || Loss ||align=left| Albert Kraus || K-1 World MAX 2005 Final Quarter-final || Yokohama, Kanagawa, Japan || Decision (unanimous) || 3 || 3:00
|-  style="background:#cfc;"
| 2005-05-04 || Win ||align=left| Shane Chapman || K-1 World MAX 2005 World Tournament Open || Kōtō, Tokyo, Japan || KO (left body shot) || 3 || 2:08
|-  style="background:#fbb;"
| 2004-12-18 || Loss ||align=left| Sakmongkol Sithchuchok || K-1 Challenge 2004 Oceania vs World || Gold Coast, Australia || Decision (split) || 5(Ex.2) || 3:00
|-  style="background:#cfc;"
| 2004-11-06 || Win ||align=left| Oomsin Sitkuanam || SNKA&K-1 "Titans 1st" || Kitakyūshū, Fukuoka, Japan || Decision (unanimous) || 3 || 3:00
|-  style="background:#fbb;"
| 2004-10-13 || Loss ||align=left| Arslan Magomedov || K-1 World MAX 2004 Champions' Challenge || Shibuya, Tokyo, Japan || Decision (majority) || 4(Ex.1) || 3:00
|-  style="background:#fbb;"
| 2004-07-07 || Loss ||align=left| Buakaw Por. Pramuk || K-1 World MAX 2004 World Tournament Final || Shibuya, Tokyo, Japan || Ext R.Decision (split) || 4(Ex.1) || 3:00
|-  style="background:#cfc;"
| 2004-05-22 || Win ||align=left| Gregory Swerts || SuperLeague Switzerland 2004 || Winterthur, Switzerland || KO (punches) || 4 || ?
|-  style="background:#cfc;"
| 2004-04-07 || Win ||align=left| Duane Ludwig || K-1 World MAX 2004 World Tournament Open || Shibuya, Tokyo, Japan || Decision (unanimous) || 3 || 3:00
|-  style="background:#cfc;"
| 2004-03-20 || Win ||align=left| Fadi Merza || SuperLeague Italy 2004 || Padova, Veneto, Italy || Decision (unanimous) || 5 || 3:00
|-  style="background:#cfc;"
| 2004-03-04 || Win ||align=left| Nuengtrakarn Por.Muang Ubon || S1 World Championships 2004, Final || Bangkok, Thailand || Decision (unanimous) || 3 || 3:00
|-
! style=background:white colspan=9 |
|-  style="background:#cfc;"
| 2004-03-04 || Win ||align=left| Jean-Charles Skarbowsky || S1 World Championships 2004, Semi Finals || Bangkok, Thailand || TKO (referee stoppage) || 3 || 0:40
|-  style="background:#cfc;"
| 2004-03-04 || Win ||align=left| Magomed Magomedov || S1 World Championships 2004, Quarter Finals || Bangkok, Thailand || Decision (unanimous) || 3 || 3:00
|-  style="background:#fbb;"
| 2003-12-06 || Loss ||align=left| Kamal El Amrani || SuperLeague Netherlands 2003 || Rotterdam, Netherlands || Decision (unanimous) || 5 || 3:00
|-  style="background:#cfc;"
| 2003-07-04 || Win ||align=left| Ryuji Goto || Shoot boxing "S of the World Vol.4" || Osaka, Osaka, Japan || TKO (referee stoppage) || 7(Ex.2) || 2:24
|-  style="background:#cfc;"
| 2003-04-27 || Win ||align=left| Hiroyuki Doi || Xplosion 4 "Shoot boxing vs Muay Thai 3" || Sydney, Australia || KO (knee strike) || 4 || 2:23
|-  style="background:#cfc;"
| 2002-12-15 || Win ||align=left| Ryuji Goto || Xplosion Boonchu S-cup || Gold Coast, Australia || Decision (unanimous) || 5 || 3:00
|-  style="background:#fbb;"
| 2002-11-26 || Loss ||align=left| Mike Zambidis || K-1 Oceania MAX 2002 Final || Melbourne, Australia || Decision (majority) || 3 || 3:00
|-
! style=background:white colspan=9 |
|-  style="background:#cfc;"
| 2002-11-26 || Win ||align=left| Shane Chapman || K-1 Oceania MAX 2002 Semi-final || Melbourne, Australia|| KO (right cross) || 3 ||
|-  style="background:#cfc;"
| 2002-11-26 || Win ||align=left| Alex Tui || K-1 Oceania MAX 2002, Quarter-final || Melbourne, Australia || TKO (corner stoppage) || 3 || 1:30
|-  style="background:#cfc;"
| 2002-10-25 || Win ||align=left| Scott Bannan || Boonchu Cup || Southport, Queensland || Decision (unanimous) || 5 || 3:00
|-  style="background:#fbb;"
| 2002-07-06 || Loss ||align=left| Nuengtakang Por.Muang Ubon || Le Grand Tournoi, Quarter-final || Paris, France || Decision ||  || 3:00
|-  style="background:#cfc;"
| 2002-06-01 || Win ||align=left| Baxter Humby || World Championship Kickboxing || Bernalillo, New Mexico, United States || TKO || 3 || ?
|-  style="background:#cfc;"
| 2002-03-23 || Win ||align=left| Rodtung Wor-Taveekeat ||  Master Toddy Show @ Stardust Casino || Las Vegas, Nevada, United States || Decision (unanimous) || 5 || 3:00
|-  style="background:#cfc;"
| 2001-12-05 || Win ||align=left| Miguel Marques || Kings Cup Tournament Final || Sanam Luang, Thailand || Decision (unanimous) || 5 || 3:00
|-
! style=background:white colspan=9 |
|-  style="background:#cfc;"
| 2001-12-05 || Win ||align=left| Duen Easarn || Kings Cup Tournament Semi-final || Sanam Luang, Thailand || Decision (unanimous) || 3 || 3:00
|-  style="background:#cfc;"
| 2001-12-05 || Win ||align=left| Suriya Sor Ploenchit || Kings Cup Tournament Quarter-final || Sanam Luang, Thailand || Decision (unanimous) || 3 || 3:00
|-  style="background:#cfc;"
| 2000-12-05 || Win ||align=left| Orono Por Muang Ubon || Thai King's Birthday Event "Kings Cup" || Sanam Luang, Thailand || Decision (unanimous) || 5 || 3:00
|-
! style=background:white colspan=9 |
|-  style="background:#cfc;"
| 2000-10-13 || Win ||align=left| Scott Bannan || K-1 Queensland 2000 || Brisbane, Australia || KO (right knee strike) || 2 || 2:09
|-
! style=background:white colspan=9 |
|-  style="background:#cfc;"
| 2000-06-17 || Win ||align=left| Oliver Olsen || The Ashes Muay Thai Megashow || Brisbane, Australia || TKO || ? || ?
|-  style="background:#cfc;"
| 2000-05-20 || Win ||align=left| Darren Reece || Boonchu Cup Muay Thai Explosion || Southport, Queensland || TKO || ? || ?
|-  style="background:#fbb;"
| 2000-02-04 || Loss ||align=left| Shane Chapman || Judgement Day Super 8, Semi Final || Melbourne, Victoria, Australia || Decision (unanimous) || 3 || 3:00
|-  style="background:#fbb;"
| 2000-02-04 || Loss ||align=left| Daniel Dawson || Judgement Day Super 8, Quarter Final || Melbourne, Victoria, Australia || Decision (unanimous) || 4(Ex.1) || 3:00
|-
! style=background:white colspan=9 |
|-  style="background:#c5d2ea;"
| 1999-12-24 || Draw||align=left| Chandet Sor Prantalay || MAJKF TORNADO WARNING || Tokyo, Japan || Decision  || 5 || 3:00
|-  style="background:#cfc;"
| 1999-12-05 || Win ||align=left| Paeng-rit Sor Prapaporn || Thai King's Birthday "King's Cup" || Sanam Luang, Bangkok, Thailand || Decision (unanimous) || 5 || 3:00
|-  style="background:#cfc;"
| 1999-10-03 || Win ||align=left| John Myles || Gold Coast Encounter || Southport, Queensland || ? || ? || ?
|-  style="background:#cfc;"
| 1999-05-23 || Win ||align=left| Daniel Dawson || X-plosion I || Gold Coast, Australia || Decision (unanimous) || 5 || 3:00
|-
! style=background:white colspan=9 |
|-  style="background:#cfc;"
| 1999-04-24 || Win ||align=left| Kenichi Ogata || MAJKF "In Search of The Strongest" || Bunkyo, Tokyo, Japan || KO (Left Hook)|| 2 || 1:48
|-  style="background:#fbb;"
| 1998-09-19 || Loss ||align=left| Takashi Ito || AJKF & MAJKF Joint Event || Bunkyo, Tokyo, Japan || TKO (doctor stoppage) || 2 || 2:47
|-  style="background:#fbb;"
| 1998-- || Loss ||align=left| Chris Allen || || Melbourne, Australia || TKO (Doctor Stoppage) || 5 ||
|-  style="background:#cfc;"
| 1998-04-25 || Win ||align=left| Takayuki Kohiruimaki || J-Network || Tokyo, Japan ||  Decision (unanimous) || 5 || 3:00
|-  style="background:#fbb;"
| 1998-- || Loss ||align=left| Superlek Sorn E-Sarn || || Thailand || KO (right cross) || 4 || 
|-  style="background:#cfc;"
| 1997-12-05 || Win ||align=left| Vihoknoi Ch.Malithong || Thai King's Birthday Event "King's Cup" || Samut Prakan, Thailand || Decision (unanimous) || 5 || 3:00
|-  style="background:#fbb;"
| 1997-07-06 || Loss ||align=left| Orono Por Muang Ubon || Chachoengsao || Bangkok, Thailand || TKO (doctor stoppage) || 2 || 
|-  style="background:#cfc;"
| 1997-05-30 || Win ||align=left| Joe Louie Muangsarin || Lumpinee Stadium || Bangkok, Thailand || TKO (right uppercuts) || 4 || 

|-  style="background:#cfc;"
| 1996- || Win ||align=left| Raktae Muangsurin ||  ||  Thailand || TKO (retirement/low kicks) || 3 || 

|-  style="background:#cfc;"
| 1995- || Win ||align=left| Takashi Nakajima || Conrad Jupiters Fights  || Gold Coast, Australia || KO (Low kick)|| 3 || 
|-  style="background:#cfc;"
| 1995- || Win ||align=left| Scott Lovelock ||  ||  Australia || TKO  || 5 || 
|-
| colspan=9 | Legend:

Titles

Muay Thai & Kickboxing
 World Kickboxing Association (WKA) 
 2013 WKA World Middleweight (−72.5 kg/159.8 lb) Oriental Championship
 2010 WKA Muay Thai World Middleweight Championship 72.5 kg
 1994 WKA South Pacific Super Lightweight Champion
 1992 WKA Australian Super Lightweight Champion
 World Kickboxing Federation (WKBF)
 2011 WKBF K-1 Middleweight World Champion
 World Kickboxing Network (WKN)
 2010 WKN Thai boxing World Super welterweight(72.6 kg) Champion
 Lion Fight 
 2009 Lion Fight Super Welterweight Title Contender
 International Kickboxer Magazine
 2008 International Kickboxer Magazine Champion
 World Muaythai Council (WMC)
 2008 WMC Contender Asia Runner up
 2007 WMC Thai boxing Middleweight World Champion
 2001 Kings Cup Tournament Champion* 1999 Winner Kings Cup
 1999 WMTC (Now WMC) Australian Jr. Middleweight Champion
 1997 Kings Cup Winner
 K-1
 2005 K-1 World MAX World Final 8
 2004 K-1 World MAX World Final 8
 2002 K-1 Oceania MAX finalist
 2000 ISKA Muay Thai World Middleweight Champion
 WKBA 
 2005 WKBA K-1 World Welterweight Champion (Defence: 1)
 Onesongchai Promotion
 2004 S-1 Muay Thai World Middleweight Tournament Champion
 IMF 
 2000 IMF Kings Cup Muay Thai World Middleweight Champion

Boxing
 2001 Australian Boxing Middleweight Champion

Awards
 2004 Fighter of the Year by IronLife Magazine
 2004 Fighter of the year by International Kickboxer Magazine
 1997 Best Farang Fighter in Thailand.

See also
Champions of Champions Elite
List of K-1 events
List of male kickboxers
Muay Thai
The Contender Asia

References

External links

1976 births
Living people
Australian male kickboxers
Middleweight kickboxers
Australian Muay Thai practitioners
Sportspeople from the Gold Coast, Queensland
Australian male boxers
The Contender (TV series) participants
Middleweight boxers
ONE Championship kickboxers
Muay Thai promoters
Sportsmen from Queensland